Empress Yang (30 June 1162 – 18 January 1233), formally titled Empress Gongsheng, was a Chinese empress consort of the Song dynasty, married to Emperor Ningzong of Song. She served as the co-regent of Emperor Lizong and ultimately like a de facto empress regnant though not actually one from 1224 until her death in 1233 at the age of 71, having been the de facto ruler of the Southern Song Dynasty for 30 whole years. Empress Yang, also known by the name Yang Meizi, is considered "one of the most powerful empresses of the Song dynasty and is allegedly considered the Southern Song Dynasty's most powerful Empress at the time"

She was genuinely asserted to have been wise and intelligent, ruthless and at times malicious while she tried to maintain a saintly and liberal acumen she was an astute wielder of power both virtually and actually at court and in the palace, manipulative and strangely enough from an ambiguous background. However contemporary history suggests that she just had most of her history altered for entirely political reasons.

To become a most competent Sovereign she was the second Empress in the dynasty after the Empress Dowager Liu to come from a humble background to become the most powerful woman in the world serving as the de facto ruler of the Southern Song Dynasty for 22 years and through political machinations as Imperial Regent de jure for 8 years.

Biography
It is said that she came from Kuaiji. She was reportedly either the biological or the adopted daughter of a female musician, Zhang Shansheng (d. 1170), who was at one point employed in the palace, and became an actress in service of the Empress Dowager Wu. Historical accounts indicate that Zhang Shansheng left the palace, but eventually returned after learning that her daughter would become a famous politician through a vision. Zhang Shansheng then returned to the palace as a court musician, rising through the ranks due to her musical abilities. Empress Wu called for Madame Zhang sometime after her arrival, only to find that Madame Zhang had, by that point, passed away. Yang Meizi, her daughter, was the natural substitute, and was placed immediately into imperial precincts.

In this position, she came to the attention of the future Emperor Ningzong. It is important to note that many biographical details about Empress Yang are unclear, and, while this simply be a product of misplaced facts over the past centuries, some studies have noted the potential for purposeful omissions in her personal details for political reasons.

Recent historiography uncovered a connection between Yang Meizi and Empress Yang, connecting them after centuries of belief that they were in fact two different people. This discovery led to the upheaval of previous narratives about both people. Yang Meizi, hitherto dismissed as concerned chiefly with romance and beauty, was granted a dimension of leadership and acumen. Empress Yang, already respected, added an aspect of humanity which was formerly foreign.

As imperial concubine
In 1195, the first year of the Qingyuan era, she married with Zhao Kuang, and was named the Lady of Pingle Commandery (平乐郡夫人). She was promoted to the title jieyu (婕妤) three years later in 1197 when sadly Grand Empress Dowager Wu nearly 83 years old perished within the Cifu Palace which to her was a shock and it seemed like she'd lost her main pillar in the harem. She had the palace eunuchs find an official who was willing to be her accomplice in changing her family history, and with his cooperation, she claimed to be the sister of the official Yang Cishan, and assumed his surname Yang after which she invited him to the palace for a "reunion feast" to celebrate the discovery of her long lost family. who proved to be sufficiently helpful in her rise as In the fifth year of Qingyuan (1199), Yang was promoted to wanyi (婉仪), and to guifei which was the Highest Title a secondary wife could attain (贵妃) a year later.

As imperial noble consort
In 1200, Empress Gongshu died of an illness. Both Beauty Cao (曹美人), described as gentle and submissive, and Yang who had bore the Emperor two sons were favoured by the emperor. On top of that, She had managed to effectively run the harem and preside over most duties of the Inner Court given the absence of a strong Empress Dowager at the time. Han Tuozhou, an uncle of the dead Empress Han, advised against the appointment of Yang because of her ambition having been a commoner who became a Consort he dreaded her talents so much. The Emperor arranged a dinner for each consort to decide which one to make his empress. Yang allowed Cao to have her dinner first. This meant, that the Emperor came to Yang's dinner at night, being already somewhat drunk after having attended the dinner of consort Cao. Yang convinced the drunk emperor to sign the edict making her empress at the table. The first edict was intercepted by Han Tuozhou, as she had expected. Believing he had won over her, Han Tuozhou relaxed his guard, while Yang triumphed over him by convincing the emperor to sign another edict making her empress.

As empress consort 
Empress Yang proved in no time a de facto boss as soon as she came to the phoenix throne and became an Empress and given the conditions in the palace they each proved more than favourable.

Her husband Emperor Ningzong was a man who had been brought up as a pampered child, he was the unfortunate victim of the terrible family conflicts between both His father the Emperor Guangzong and his grandfather the Retired Emperor Xiaozong a situation which exacerbated with the intense rivalries between his mother the Empress Li and his Great Grandmother the Grand Empress Dowager Wu. As a result, he appeared to have never emotionally recovered from these psychological wounds and even if he was mature and possessed the qualities of a good ruler, he was a man of frail health and questionable mental faculties which suited the Empress Yang's exploits.

Empress Yang did not forgive Han Tuozhou for hampering her coronation, tried several times to turn the emperor against him first by appointing the members of the Wu Clan to power to rival the growing influence of the Han Clan under him and even had her brother rise to the position of A General he lived like a First rank Marquis which politically empowered her.

Following the Jin-Song wars of 1205-07 which ended in a stalemate, she'd garnered immense support as the Militaristic Han Touzhou had become unpopular which fermented enough hatred towards him and sowed seeds that were sufficient for her to orchestrate his downfall as the Emperor grew less confident in him and furthermore with the death of Empress Han there was no one to plead his case as the last surviving Empress Dowager in the Palace Grand Empress Dowager Xie was herself ailing and near death as she was also entirely politically detached even within the harem and the Inner Court.

Finally, the Empress Yang sent her ally Shi Miyuan and her brother Yang Cishan to murder him in 1207, on his way to the Palace for the Daily Assembly, he was intercepted at the Sixth Platoon Bridge by the Imperial Guard Commander Xie, dragged into the Yuchin garden right outside the Imperial City and by a mob of infuriated elite Palace guards, he was bludgeoned to death amidst great humiliation only a few hours to the hour of noon. The emperor discovered the plot, but she pleaded with him not to side with her enemy less she should commit suicide, and he agreed not to interfere.

Her ally Shi Miyuan rose in rank to the position of Minister of Rites and eventually became Grand chancellor a year later, a position in which he came to dominate the Imperial Court to the point of even placing spies within the Palace, nothing that happened within the Palace was kept secret from him he even had a girl placed as a spy with the designated crown prince of the emperor.
Empress Yang is among the many regents in ancient China said to have partaken in ghostwriting. She was capable of mimicking her husband Emperor Ningzong's handwriting, and she sometimes used this ghostwriting ability for her political maneuverings. It is highly possible that she has appropriated Ningzong's hand to send out imperial "consents" for Han Tuozhou, her political rival, to be expelled from the imperial precincts and be assassinated. Ghostwriting was also used extensively by rulers in and around the Song dynasty as a way of delegation of imperial responsibility, but was sometimes cast in bad light because of its inclusion of the lower classes as ghostwriters. Empress Yang was among those who employed ghostwriters on occasion for her own political endeavors.

Consolidation of powerZhao, Yi. Study on the Female Painting and Calligraphy in the Southern Song Dynasty from the Controversies of “Hundred Flowers Scroll.” Jiang Su University, Master Dissertation, 2017. 

It was quite clear from the very beginning that the Empress Yang enjoyed political favour and on a number of occasions acted wisely with self restraint with the intention of curtailing the possibility of being censured for her interference lest she'd be dubbed more less like the Empress Zhangxian of the Liu Clan and the Empress Wu Hou of the Tang Dynasty.

Nonetheless, a Balance of Power existed at the Imperial Court between the bureaucracy and the Palace and a relationship which was mutually prosperous ensued especially when her foster son Zhao Kai who had been designated the Crown Prince loved and respected her as though she was his mother and on a number of occasions she supported his claims and accorded her political counsel it made it close to impossible to diminish her influence that she vividly stood out to represent the true power behind the throne and Emperor Ningzong grew to trust her to soon enough make her his secret Chief advisor, she revised his petitions and suggested appointments and dismissals of officials in the Court.

Her power was climaxed when she had the Imperial Seal that had once been misused by Han Touzhou returned to the palace and particularly in her care which Imperial prerogative had last been exercised by the Late Grand Empress Dowager Wu her mentor and perfect master she was remarked to have possessed the poise of the Empress Wu.

This privilege had continued for about fifteen years and she lacked sufficient opposition especially since her ally Shi Miyuan controlled the Grand Chancellory but just as she was up for yet another challenge, a young contender was to be beckoned with.

Zhao Hong who was the adopted son of Zhao Kai, who in turn was the biological son of Emperor Xiaozong and therefore, an adopted cousin of the reigning Emperor Ningzong was more than determined to downplay the Empress' growing political influence.

Such a passionate young man he had so seemed when the Crown Prince Zhao Xun died in 1220 from dysentery and Emperor Ningzong asked for a boy at least 14 years old to adopt with the hope of eliminating the possibility of a regency following his death. Zhao Hong was selected, adopted, and installed as Crown Prince in 1221 while the Empress watched quietly.

By nature, the New Crown Prince was a man of versatile attitudes and no compromise, independent and not the type of person to play second fiddle to a woman and while the Empress went to great efforts to try and strengthen her mother and foster son relationship in the hopes of pacifying him, his ambitions served to demolish whatever efforts the aging woman had invested as he made a rather indirect public disregard of her which situation became poisonous when he started to censure her involvement in the affairs of State and served to continue showing his support to Consort Cao her one time rival for the Empress' throne.

Given all the divergent incidents transpiring in the Imperial Court, the powerful Grand Chancellor and political ally of Empress Yang Shi Miyuan did not want Hong to succeed Ningzong when he died because Shi Miyuan had once found Zhao Hong sober and passed out on his quarters and in 1223, a lute-playing girl forced to act like a spy by Shi Miyuan spied on Zhao Hong and reported to Shi that once Zhao Hong would become Emperor, he would banish and exile Shi Miyuan and subordinates to the far south.

The Empress had tried so much to warn the young man she'd even cautioned him saying "If Your Imperial Highness would be kind to listen to loyal officials then surely the Mandate of Heaven shall be vested in you but should their will become for you a hamper to curtail your ambitions, assured for you is the fate of entirely dire consequences" but to no avail and Shi Miyuan not wanting to lose his power decided to send his ally Yu Tianxi to locate a suitable heir. Yu found Zhao Yuju, a minor official in Shaoxing and sent him to Shi. Shi decided to groom him as the potential heir renaming him Zhao Guicheng and forced Empress Yang onto the plot but allegedly herself insatiable she was bound to agree as long as it meant that she'd retain her power and even gain more.

When Emperor Ningzong died, Shi Miyuan wished to have another of the Imperial princes, Zhao Yun, placed on the throne instead. Empress Yang had initially refused to cooperate, but when Shi Miyuan threatened to have the entire Yang clan massacred, she agreed to fabricate the edict which installed Zhao Yun on the throne that he first brought Zhao Guicheng into the throne room and put him on the dragon throne and then called Zhao Hong into the room without any bodyguards. Shi Miyuan then said that Zhao Guicheng was now the Emperor sparking protests from Zhao Hong until he was forced to bow in recognition of Zhao Guicheng. Zhao Hong was moved to a nearby prefecture, Huzhou where he could live in luxury.

As empress dowager and regent
In gratitude for giving him the throne, Emperor Lizong invited her to reign as his co-regent behind a lowered silk and pearl screen. She accepted the offer and ruled jointly with him until her death in 1233, eight years later. To the opposition of many at court, she selected Empress Xie Daoqing rather than the emperor's favorite Consort Jia (died 1247) as empress.

Empress Dowager Yang in assuming the co-regency with Emperor Lizong whom she had adopted become a most astute wielder of power at the Imperial Court and could just issue about any decree that she wanted when she wanted it, became the arbitrator of bureaucratic disputes and went ahead to celebrate her birthday's with special names that In the second year of Baoqing (1226), Empress Gongsheng became Empress dowager Shouming. In the first year of Shaoding (1228), she was additionally named Empress Dowager Shoumingcirui (寿明慈睿皇太后). In the fourth year of Shaoding (1231), she was made Empress Dowager Shoumingrenfucirui (寿明仁福慈睿皇太后)

She proved not so different from her other predecessors when she went ahead to send envoys to the Jurchens in her own name and also had open meetings with the Courtiers especially Shi Miyuan her long time ally it was rumoured that because of this relationship they shared they to some people looked no different from lovers. She went an extra step to style herself as Her Imperial Majesty and the Officials referred to her as "Bixia" which titles was reserved for only Emperors and because Emperor Lizong allowed himself to be politically dominated by his foster mother, her actions ultimately made her appear no less than an Emperor herself as she could appoint and dismiss any official as she pleased, pass Edicts without the Emperor's consent, used "Zhen" to refer to herself, she was at the head of all ceremony, the final Court of Appeal and aside from the Grand Chancellor for National stability and peace was the only person entitled to provide guidance and advice to the Imperial Crown.

It was in Emperor Lizong's regime that she further cemented her political footing having been instrumental in crushing Zhao Hong's revolt where he decided to return to the capital to take his rightful throne after he yielded to the pressure from his supporters. The coup d'état intended for victory in merely weeks was rendered a political fiasco after which he was deemed a rebel on her own charges of treason and conspiring against the throne, the nation and the Court, he was tried by a State Tribunal which was her handiwork and even though the Emperor was unwilling to kill him, the verdict in days' time was ruled in her favour and the young Prince met his fatal end with her instituting his punishment as an imperial order to commit suicide by strangulation that his filthy blood might not stain the palace.

Her rather kind nature on the outside proved her to be a most popular political figure however beyond the Imperial Court among the people however and she in turn was idolized as the Goddess of mercy Guanyin and being a staunch patron of the Arts and Buddhism spent much of her personal wealth renovating and expanding temple complexes, funding the academies and also retraining and requipping the Southern Song Dynasty's army which having gone through long regimes of peace had become an inefficient institution.

More than once she persisted to carry out a number of Religious ceremonies in public which accorded her a celestial aura for example the Sericultural Ceremony to the goddess of silkworms which she carried out as the Empress Dowager yet it had been largely reserved for Empress Consorts alone and the worship at the Ancestral Temple which had become another popularised trend by powerful Empress Dowagers following the Example of the Empress Zhangxian which ritual was supposed to be done by the Emperor she was therefore the third and last woman ruler to do so after Empresses Liu and Wu of the Gaozong Emperor both of the Song Dyansty.

In the last decade of her life and 30 year de facto reign over the Empire, the once weak and vulnerable state with its military force had become a strong formidable one as she reduced greatly the influence of the merchant clans and political factions in the Court and restored more power to the throne which had been largely curtailed following the reign of the Guangzong Emperor and his wife the Empress Li.

She made other contributions to farmers by renting out the idle fertile lands of the Imperial family to the commoners, fostered International trading relations with Goryeo and Japan, India and Tibet and went ahead to develop roads and trading centres which economically strengthened the Empire and eventually rid the Southern Song Court of Corrupt officials which oversaw its survival that she was responsible for concluding an alliance with the Mongols which safeguarded the State from foreign threats.

She continued to expand the number of applicants from humble families to take the Imperial examinations and become officials in the Southern Song Dynasty but however, she had built a system only she could sustain.

Death
In the fifth year, she died in Ciming Palace, and was named Gongshengrenlie (恭圣仁烈) posthumously.

After her death, the influence of the Yang, Shi, Ma and Wu Clans on which she had greatly relied for her own political survival consequently diminished. Shi Miyuan though still Grand Chancellor was psychologically and emotionally troubled suffered from trauma considering how close he had been with the Empress Dowager which led many to speculate that the two political allies had even been lovers. Historically though it is asserted that Shi Miyuan never recovered from the depression and grief and his grip over State Affairs loosened as his health declined and eventually he died ten months later to be succeeded by Deng Daqian.
 
Consequently the rapid decline of the Song Dynasty was because she had left behind a poor and weak choice of an Empress for her successor and the Emperor Lizong did little to improve the condition of his people as he lacked her foresight and advice and was least interested in handling the affairs of State.

By the time of her death in 1233, the Empress Dowager Yang had been the eighth of nine Powerful Southern Song Empresses Liu, Cao, Gao, Xiang, Meng, Wu, Li the stage soon turned in favour of another fair Empress Xie, her own daughter in law she'd earlier own supported that unbeknownst to many, she was bound to be last great powerful Empress of Nan Song.

Empress Yang and the arts

Poetry 

Empress Yang is one of the most prominent Song dynasty poets who wrote in the genre of Shengping (升平). Shengping poetry, a style created by Emperor Taizong of the Song Dynasty when he was admiring spring blossoms with members of his court, focused primarily on the celebration of court life and the prospect of a peaceful and prosperous world under the court rule. Around fifty surviving poems of Empress Yang were collected by Mao Jin in the Ming dynasty and included in the Er Jia Gong Ci (二家宫词）alongside those of Emperor Huizong. It is worth mentioning that Empress Yang was one of the only four female poetry writers of the Song Dynasty whose works have survived, which makes her works even more valuable. Formatted mainly in the style of Qi Jue (七绝), Yang's Gong Ci poems depict the rich beauty of the imperial court, focusing on the elaborate lives of court figures of the emperor as well as courtesans and ministers of the inner court and celebrate the peace and stability of the Southern Song Dynasty perceived from her standpoint as an Empress. Similar to her poetic inscriptions, Empress Yang also regularly utilized the metaphor of flowers or other natural subjects as a metaphor for celebrating people or general characteristics of the royal family. For example, in the thirteenth entry of her Gong Ci, the description of lotus flowers in bloom is in fact an allegory for the lively peace of imperial court:

The curtains of the water hall are hooked to the wind, the rich blossoms of the lotus flowers have reddened people's reflections. My Emperor have finished his song on the flowery strings, and all earthly annoyance have trickled away.

Utilizing the imagery of a naturalistic water hall and blooming lotus, the first two lines of the poem highlights the beauty of the imperial garden, signifying the free-flowing and vibrant spirit of the royal family. The subsequent two lines then demonstrate the artistic talent of the emperor for being able to transcend "all the vulgarities" with his instrument, implying the main theme of celebrating the harmony of the court and the pursuit of literary elegance.

Painting 
Some scholars believe that Holding Wine Cups under the Moon (Tianjin Museum) and Cherry Blossoms and Oriole (Shanghai Museum) are painted by Empress Yang. It is also widely believed that the Hundred Flowers Scroll, the oldest surviving painting by female artist in Chinese art history, should be attributed to Empress Yang, but there are many controversies surrounding this issue.

Artistic commissions 

Empress Yang is best known for her collaborations with the Song court painter Ma Yuan. She was a gifted calligrapher, and her poems often graced Ma Yuan's works in a sort of accompaniment or explanation. It can be argued that recent art history values the poems more than the paintings, as they are indicative of the opinions and views of the nobility. Empress Yang's increasing popularity has also made some of her work far more valuable as of late.

Stylistically, Ma Yuan favored the infusion of nature with humans and man-made structures. As was indicative of his time, the landscape is not merely a background, but a subject - a living, dynamic, active player in the work. Depictions of royal architecture are central to his style, partly due to trends in art during his time, but also due to his occupation as a court painter. Specifically for his work with Empress Yang, light imagery and illustrations of the graceful facets of natural Chinese landscapes - blossoms, bamboo, and mountains are among the most abundant images in works between the two.

A perfect example of such a collaboration is Ma Yuan's Night Banquet, currently housed in Taipei's National Palace Museum. It depicts the title event in the characteristic details of Emperor Ningzong's administration while staying true to the painter's style and the demands of Song artistic culture. In the background, large mountains rise above the horizon, while fog and low clouds occupy the vertical center. Far below, a palace is pictured, with several ministers and court patrons exchanging pleasantries. The arrangement of the features in the work give room above the palace for Empress Yang's calligraphy, which emphasizes the feelings of a warm, damp summer night in Hangzhou, the capital of the Song dynasty. Further connecting the poem and the painting, a recent feat of art historians of the period, are details about the Han Hall, presumably the palace pictured, and descriptions of such an event as a banquet.

Night Banquet is a prime example of the themes explored in Empress Yang's poetry, as she reimagined literary culture to represent the values common in Confucian women while fundamentally challenging assumptions of the gender held by many in her time. For example, her encouragement of such frivolities involving alcohol as those depicted in Night Banquet could be seen as unbecoming of a Confucian woman, but she was also politically inclined to support the customs of the nobility. Her embrace of the noble culture and the reclamation of that culture for women has made her a famous figures in contemporary studies of how gender roles were challenged in older East Asian societies.

Empress Yang is also the writer of several important inscriptions in the paintings of Xia Gui, a landscape painter of Song Dynasty, such as in Twelve Views of Landscape. Based on her achievement in poetic inscription, art historian John Hay commented that "before [Empress Yang's] time no scroll or fan was ever viewed as such an intimate union of word and image."

Inscriptions (attributed) 

Ma Yuan, Attending the Banquet by Lantern Light, with poetic inscription attributed to Emperor Ningzong. Early thirteenth century, Southern Song period. Hanging scroll, ink and color on silk, 111.9 x 535 cm. National Palace Museum, Taipei.

Ma Yuan, Apricot Blossoms. Twelfth century. Southern Song period. Album leaf, ink and color on silk, 25.2 x 25.3 cm. National Palace Museum, Taipei.

Ma Lin, Layer upon Layer of Icy Tips. Dated 1216, Southern Song period. Hanging scroll, ink and color on silk, 101.7 x 49.6 cm. Palace Museum, Beijing.

Ma Yuan, Peach Blossoms. Album leaf, 25.8 x 27.3 cm. National Palace Museum, Taipei.

Ma Yuan, Dong shan Wading through Water, with encomium by Empress Yang. Early thirteenth century. Southern Song period. Hanging scroll, ink and color on silk, 77.6x33cm. Tokyo National Museum.

Ma Yuan, Holding Wine Cups under the Moon. Late twelfth to early thirteenth century. Southern Song period. Album leaf, ink and color on silk, 25.3 x 27.5 cm. Tianjin Art Museum.

Ma Yuan, Twelve Scenes of Water. Dated 1222. Album leaves mounted as a handscroll. Ink and light color on silk, 26.8 x 41.6 cm, each. Palace Museum, Beijing.

Ma Yuan, Presenting Wine. Late twelfth to early thirteenth century. Southern Song period. Album leaf, ink and color on silk, 25.6 x 28.5 cm. Tang Shi Fan Collection.

Anonymous, Golden Blossoms of the Weeping Willow. Twelfth century. Southern Song period. Album leaf, ink and color on silk. 25.8 x 24.6 cm. Palace Museum, Beijing.

Layer Upon Layer on Icy Tips 
This painting differs from most other paintings carrying an inscription by Empress Yang: it is attributed not to Ma Yuan, but to his son Ma Lin; it is a hanging scroll, a more public medium than the usual fan or album leaf; the dedicated recipient is not Emperor Ningzong, but rather the Supervisor in Chief Wang. It is originally one of a set of four hanging scrolls depicting different plum blossoms.

The painting features two branches covered with white blossoms of palace plum (gongmei). Empress Yang's poetic inscription utilized the poetic mode of yongwu, or the singing of objects, to foster a personal reading of the blossoms. She portrays the plum as a timeless beauty withstanding the winter cold, pure and lofty—the qualities that Empress Yang wished to associate herself with as a powerful empress.

The calligraphy style of this inscription is notably different from Empress Yang's calligraphy in an earlier painting, Apricot Blossoms. While the former can be characterized as smooth and bold, the later seems more slender and restrained. It is deduced that in Layer, she was perhaps mimicking the calligraphy style of Yan Zhenqing, a renowned calligrapher of Tang Dynasty. The calligraphy of Layer borrowed the proportion of Yan's characters, as each stroke was distributed evenly. The details of the brushwork—such as the heavy and tapered vertical strokes, and the “swallowtail” notch at the end of the right-falling strokes—demonstrated her deep learning of the calligraphy style of the Tang Dynasty. The employment of this "masculine" style of writing perhaps also reflects Empress Yang's own political ambition in the Song court.

Legacy

The Empress Yang was an Empowering and virtuous sagacious Empress Dowager who was diplomatic and she reformed and strengthened the Southern Song Dynasty and through her political skills safeguarded it from the Mongols and the Jurchens, ultimately she had a hand in the destruction of the enemy Jurchen Empire that had long terrorized the Song Empire and earned her place as the most fairly liberal Empress of her time.

Empress Yang was a woman above all deception and if the History books never had it then it was that she was a most remarkable mortal goddess and even her funeral was conducted no different from that of an Emperor that even the Ming Dynasty scholars though censuring her asserted that she was in deed a very capable Monarch much as there isn't adequate historical evidence to pronounce about how powerful she was because the shift in the Dynasties roughly fifty years later so a lot of destruction of the Southern Song Dynasty records, it remains that she was none the less one of the most influential women in Chinese History that are revered to this very day.

It is believed that in the Song Dynasty's Imperial history out of its nine Great Empresses, Empress Yang alongside Empress Liu, Empress Gao and Empress Wu were the most politically apt and broad-minded.

Titles

During the reign of Emperor Ningzong (1194–1224)

 Yang Cairen - 1194
 Lady of Pingle Commandery - 1195
 Jieyu - 1197
 Wanyi - 1199
 Guifei - 1200
 Empress Consort - 1202

During the reign of Emperor Lizong (1224–1233)

 Empress Dowager Yang - 1224–1226
 Empress Dowager Shouming - 1226–1228
 Empress Dowager Shoumingcirui - 1228–1231
 Empress Dowager Shoumingrenfucirui - 1231–1233

Posthumously
 Empress Gongshengrenlie - 1233

Family 

 Father: Unknown
 Mother: Zhang Shansheng, Yang Cairen

 Spouse: Emperor Ningzong

 Issue:
 Zhao Zeng (biological)
 Zhao Jiong (biological)
 Zhao Xun (adopted)
 Zhao Hong (adopted)
 Zhao Yun (adopted)

 Brother: Yang Cishan

 Daughters-in-law:
 Empress Shouhe of the Xie Clan
 Guifei of the Jia Clan
 Guifei of the Yan Clan

 Grandchildren:
 Princess Zhouhan Duanxiao
 Princess Zhenzhu
 Emperor Duzong (adopted)
 Zhao Ji, Prince Yongchong'an
 Zhao Yi Prince Zhaochongchun

In popular culture
Portrayed in the 2022 webnovel Roses of Blood by Glorian C. Regnare.

References

History of the Song Dynasty. Liezhuan. Empress Part Two

1162 births
1233 deaths
Song dynasty empresses
Song dynasty empresses dowager
13th-century women rulers
12th-century Chinese women
12th-century Chinese people
13th-century Chinese women
13th-century Chinese people
12th-century Chinese women writers
13th-century Chinese women writers
Song dynasty poets
Chinese women poets
12th-century Chinese poets
13th-century Chinese poets
12th-century Chinese actresses
People from Shaoxing